Dyment Island is a small island lying  southwest of the McKinzie Islands in the inner-central part of Cranton Bay, Antarctica. It was mapped by the United States Geological Survey from surveys and from U.S. Navy air photos, 1960–66, and was named by the Advisory Committee on Antarctic Names after Donald I. Dyment, a U.S. Navy cook at Byrd Station, 1967.

See also 
 List of Antarctic and sub-Antarctic islands

References 

Islands of Ellsworth Land